Marko Mesić may refer to:

Marko Mesić (priest) (1640–1713), a Croatian priest and war hero
Marko Mesić (soldier) (1901–1982), a Croatian soldier in the Royal Yugoslav Army and the Wehrmacht

See also
Mesić (disambiguation)